Willie Lorenzo Jones (born November 22, 1957) is a former American football defensive end in the National Football League. He was drafted by the Oakland Raiders in the second round of the 1979 NFL Draft. He played college football at Florida State.

Jones was inducted into the Florida State Seminoles Hall of Fame in 1988.

College career
Jones played college football at Florida State University from 1975 to 1978. During his career he recorded 20 sacks and was an All-American as a senior. He was the defensive MVP of the 1977 Tangerine Bowl and MVP of the 1979 Senior Bowl.

Professional career
Jones was drafted by the Oakland Raiders in the second round of the 1979 NFL Draft. He played three years for the team from 1979 to 1981 and led the team in sacks as a rookie with 10. He was also a member of the Raiders Super Bowl XV victory over the Philadelphia Eagles.

Personal
Married to Tarralyn Jones, CEO TJ's Designs & Events, 2x breast cancer survivor, brain tumor survivor, motivational speaker, and author (book Release February 2021) ~ "Living A Masked Life". His son, Christian, played college football at Florida State and in the NFL for the Bears

References

External links
Florida State Seminoles bio

1957 births
Living people
American football defensive ends
Florida State Seminoles football players
Oakland Raiders players
People from Dublin, Georgia
Players of American football from Georgia (U.S. state)